Lisa Bauer (born 13 May 1960 in Waterloo, Ontario) is a Canadian former field hockey player who competed in the 1984 Summer Olympics.

References

External links
 
 
 
 

1960 births
Living people
Sportspeople from Waterloo, Ontario
Canadian female field hockey players
Olympic field hockey players of Canada
Field hockey players at the 1984 Summer Olympics